The 2003–04 Washington State Cougars men's basketball team represented Washington State University for the 2003–04 NCAA Division I men's basketball season. Led by third-year head coach Dick Bennett, the Cougars were members of the Pacific-10 Conference and played their home games on campus at Beasley Coliseum in Pullman, Washington.

Seeded eighth in the conference tournament, the Cougars met top seed and second-ranked Stanford in the quarterfinal round and lost by 

Bennett was hired in March 2003; he was formerly the head coach at

Postseason result

|-
!colspan=5 style=| Pacific-10 Tournament

References

External links
Sports Reference – Washington State Cougars: 2003–04 basketball season

Washington State Cougars men's basketball seasons
Washington State Cougars
Washington State
Washington State